The Indian general election of 1962 elected the 3rd Lok Sabha of India and first election after formation of "Gujarat", was held from 19 to 25 February. Unlike the previous two elections but as with all subsequent elections, each constituency elected a single member. Jawaharlal Nehru won another landslide victory in his third and final election campaign. The Indian National Congress took 44.7% of the vote and won 361 of the 494 seats. In Gujarat, INC won 16 seat out of total 22 seats.

Party-wise results summary

Results- Constituency wise

References

1962 elections in India
Indian general elections in Gujarat
1960s in Gujarat